The 1912 Svenska Mästerskapet Final was played on 13 October 1912, 10 November 1912, and 17 November 1912 between the fifth-time finalists Djurgårdens IF and the twelfth-time finalists Örgryte IS. The match decided the winner of 1912 Svenska Mästerskapet, the football cup to determine the Swedish champions. Djurgårdens IF won their first title with a 3–1 victory in the second replay, played at Råsunda IP in Solna.

Route to the final

Djurgårdens IF

On the way to the final, Djurgården had beaten IFK Stockholm in the preliminary round. Djurgården drew IFK Stockholm 1–1 at home on 18 August 1912, and won the away-game replay, 1–0, on 25 August 1912. In the quarter-final on 1 September 1912, Djurgården beat Sandvikens AIK away with 2–1 in Gävle. The semi-final against IFK Eskilstuna at home ended with a Djurgården win, 4–0, on 22 September 1912.

Djurgården made their fifth Svenska Mästerskapet final after having lost in all their four previous appearances, the 1904, 1906 and 1909 finals to final opponents Örgryte IS, and the 1910 final to IFK Göteborg.

Örgryte IS

Örgryte IS entered in second qualifying round and won their second qualifying round match against Göteborgs FF on walkover. In the preliminary round, Örgryte won against Helsingborgs IF in the replay match after a 3–3 away-game draw, the replay at home ended 5–2. The first match was played 18 August 1912 in Helsingborg and the replay one week later on 25 August 1912 in Gothenburg. Fellow Gothenburg team IFK Göteborg was the opponent of the quarter-finals, which ended in a 4–2 win to Örgryte on 1 September 1912. Örgryte then won the semi-final against AIK with 1–0 at home in Gothenburg on 22 September 1912.

Örgryte made their twelfth appearance in a Svenska Mästerskapet final, having won ten, including three against final opponents Djurgården in 1904, 1906 and 1909, lost one, and only missed five.

Final matches

Final

Summary 
The final on 13 October 1912 ended in a goalless draw.

Details

1st replay

Summary 
The first replay on 10 November 1912 ended in a 2–2 draw after an equaliser in the 85th minute by Djurgården's Jean Söderberg. For the match, Djurgården was joined by forwards Richard Werner and Valdemar Johannison from IF Olympia.

Details

2nd replay

Summary 
Djurgården won the second replay 3–1 after goals by Bertil Nordenskjöld and Einar Olsson and an own goal by Örgryte's Erik Bergström.

Details

References 

Print
 
 

1912
Football in Stockholm
Football in Gothenburg
Djurgårdens IF Fotboll matches
Örgryte IS matches
October 1912 sports events
November 1912 sports events
Sports competitions in Stockholm
Sports competitions in Gothenburg
Sports competitions in Solna
1910s in Stockholm
1910s in Gothenburg